1806 was the 20th season of cricket in England since the foundation of Marylebone Cricket Club (MCC). The first two Gentlemen v Players matches took place, but the fixture was not played again until 1819.

Honours
 Most runs – William Lambert 276 (HS 64)
 Most wickets – Thomas Howard 21

Events
 The inaugural Gentlemen v Players match was held.
 With the Napoleonic War continuing, loss of investment and manpower impacted cricket and only 7 first-class matches have been recorded in 1806:
 16–18 June: All-England v Hampshire @ Lord's Old Ground
 30 June: All-England v Surrey @ Lord's Old Ground
 7–9 July: Gentlemen v Players @ Lord's Old Ground
 14–16 July: Surrey v All-England @ Moulsey Hurst
 21 & 25 July: Gentlemen v Players @ Lord's Old Ground
 5–6 August: Kent v All-England @ Bowman's Lodge, Dartford
 25–28 August: Hampshire v All-England @ Itchin Stoke Down

Debutants
1806 debutants included:
 John Willes (Kent)
 Richard Leigh (Surrey; amateur)

References

Bibliography

Further reading
 
 
 
 
 

1806 in English cricket
English cricket seasons in the 19th century